George W. Emery (August 13, 1830 – July 10, 1909) was the eleventh governor of Utah Territory.  Emery was appointed by President Ulysses S. Grant for Supervisor of Internal Revenue for the confederate states from 1870 to 1874 and governor in 1875.  After his term ended in 1880, the Utah Legislature named Emery County, Utah in honor of him.

Notes

References

1830 births
1909 deaths
Governors of Utah Territory
Utah Republicans
People from Corinth, Maine
Dartmouth College alumni